Frederick Fitchett  (1851 – 5 October 1930) was a 19th-century Member of Parliament from Dunedin, New Zealand.

Biography

Born in 1851 in Grantham, Lincolnshire, England, Fitchett was educated at the University of Melbourne and Canterbury University College, Christchurch, graduating Bachelor of Arts in 1879 and Master of Arts in 1880. He was admitted to the Bar the following year, and began practising law in Dunedin. In 1887 he was conferred with an LLD from Canterbury.

Fitchett represented the Dunedin Central electorate from 1887 to 1890, when he retired. In 1890 he was the junior opposition whip. In 1890 Fitchett visited London, where he married Lina Valerie Blain at St Simon's Church, Cadogan Square, on 16 April. The couple had one son.

In 1895 Fitchett was appointed as the parliamentary draughtsman and assistant Crown law officer. He served as solicitor-general from 1901 to 1910, and represented New Zealand at the 1907 conference of French, British and colonial representatives that considered the New Hebrides question. He was appointed public trustee in 1910, and remained in that role until his retirement in 1917. In the 1911 Coronation Honours Fitchett was appointed a Companion of the Order of St Michael and St George.

Fitchett was a member of the senate of the University of New Zealand from 1883 until 1915. He died in Auckland on 5 October 1930, and his ashes were buried at Waikumete Cemetery.

Notes

References

1851 births
1930 deaths
People from Grantham
English emigrants to New Zealand
University of Canterbury alumni
Members of the New Zealand House of Representatives
New Zealand MPs for Dunedin electorates
Independent MPs of New Zealand
New Zealand public servants
Solicitors-General of New Zealand
19th-century New Zealand politicians
New Zealand Companions of the Order of St Michael and St George
Burials at Waikumete Cemetery
19th-century New Zealand lawyers